Marina Fiordaliso, best known as Fiordaliso, is an Italian pop-rock singer. During her career she has sold over 6 million records.

Life and career
Born in Piacenza, the daughter of a drummer, Fiordaliso approached music at young age studying voice and piano. In 1981 she won the Castrocaro Music Festival with the song "Scappo via", and the following year she debuted at the Sanremo Music Festival with the reggae-rock ballad "Una sporca poesia". Her major successes, remarkably the songs "Oramai" and "Non voglio mica la luna" (written by Zucchero Fornaciari), are linked to the Sanremo Festival, in which she participated nine times between 1982 and 2002; outside the Festival, her main hit was the song "Cosa ti farei", one of the most successful songs of the Summer 1990 in Italy. In the 90s Fiordaliso gradually moved away from the musical scene without ever abandoning it, and focused on the activities of stage actress and television presenter.

She has 2 children, Sebastiano born in 1973, and Paolino in 1989.

Discography

Singles
 1982 – Una sporca poesia  
 1982 – Maschera 
 1983 – 
 1984 – Non voglio mica la luna  
 1984 – Li-be-llu-la  
 1985 – Il mio angelo 
 1985 – Sola no, non-ci sto 
 1986 – Fatti miei  
 1986 – La vita è molto di più  
 1986 – Vive  
 1987 – Il canto dell'estate  
 1988 – Per noi  
 1989 – Se non-avessi te  
 1990 – Cosa ti farei  
 1991 – Il mare più grande che c'è (I love you man)  
 1991 – Saprai (with Roby Facchinetti) 
 1992 – Dimmelo tu perché 
 1997 – Disordine mentale 
 1998 – Come si fa  
 2000 – Linda Linda (Arabian Song)  
 2003 – Estate '83  
 2007 – Io muoio  
 2008 – M'amo non M'amo 
 2009 – Canto del sole inesauribile

Foreign Singles 
 1984 – Yo no te pido la luna 
 1985 – Sola no, yo no sé estar 
 1986 – Desde hoy 
 1991 – I love you man (Il mare più grande che c'è)  
 1991 – El mar más grande que hay  
 1991 – Sabrás (with Riccardo Fogli) 
 1991 – Sposa di rosa  
 1997 – Como te amaré

Albums 
 1983 – Fiordaliso
 1984 – Fiordaliso (reissue of the above, with the addition of "Non voglio mica la luna")
 1984 – Discoquattro
 1985 – A ciascuno la sua donna
 1985 -Fiordaliso – Dal vivo per il mondo (live)
 1986 – Applausi a Fiordaliso (reissue of the above, with the addition of "Fatti miei" and the removal of "You know my way" and "Sola no, yo no sé estar") 
 1987 – Fiordaliso
 1989 – Io... Fiordaliso (collection with three new songs)
 1990 – La vita si balla
 1991 – Il portico di Dio
 1992 – Io ci sarò
 1994 – E adesso voglio la luna – I grandi successi  (collection with two new songs and 9 remixes) 
 2002 – Risolutamente decisa   (collection with three new songs and 9 remixes) 
 2004 – Come si fa  (collection with two new songs)

References

External links
 

 

1956 births
Living people
People from Piacenza
Italian pop singers
Italian rock singers